Zalesie  is a village in the administrative district of Gmina Sidra, within Sokółka County, Podlaskie Voivodeship, in north-eastern Poland.

The village has a population of 160.

Notable residents
 Uładzisłau Kazłouski, Politician

References

Villages in Sokółka County
Sokolsky Uyezd
Białystok Voivodeship (1919–1939)
Belastok Region